Artistic swimming as Synchronized swimming at the 2014 Asian Games was held in Munhak Park Tae-hwan Aquatics Center, Incheon, South Korea from September 20 to 23, 2014. Only women's events were held in three competitions. China once again dominated the competition by winning all three gold medals ahead of Japan with three silver medals.

Schedule

Medalists

Medal table

Participating nations 
A total of 76 athletes from 9 nations competed in artistic swimming at the 2014 Asian Games:

References

External links
Official website

 
2014
2014 Asian Games events
Asian Games